Turvihal, also spelled as Turvihala, This village first name is Gokshir it means  Cows milk and is a village in the Sindhanur taluk of Raichur district in the Indian state of Karnataka.
. Turvihal lies on Karnataka State Highway 6 connecting Sindhanur-Kushtagi.

Demographics
 India census, Turvihal had a population of 12356 with 6150 males and 6206 females.

See also
Pura, Kushtagi
Tavaragera
Kanakagiri
Navali gangavathi
Sindhanur
Raichur

References

External links
 http://www.raichur.nic.in

 Cities and towns in Raichur district